The Promptorium parvulorum (Latin: "Storehouse for children") is an English-Latin bilingual dictionary that was completed about 1440 AD. It was the first English-to-Latin dictionary. It occupies about 300 printed book pages. Its authorship is attributed to Geoffrey the Grammarian, a friar who lived in Lynn, Norfolk, England.

After the invention of the printing press, the Promptorium was published repeatedly in the early 16th century by printer Wynkyn de Worde. In the 19th century, the Camden Society republished it under the extended title Promptorium parvulorum sive clericorum (“Storehouse for children or clerics”). For language historians it is a major reference work for the vocabulary of late medieval English. It is a frequently cited reference in today's primary dictionary of late medieval English, the Middle English Dictionary, published by the University of Michigan.

See also 

 Catholicon Anglicum, an English-to-Latin dictionary dated 1485

References

External links
 The Promptorium Parvulorum as published in 1865, downloadable at Archive.org

15th-century Latin books
1440s books
English bilingual dictionaries
Latin dictionaries